The Kallakurichi Formation, alternatively spelled as Kallankurichchi or Kallankurichi Formation, is a geological formation of the Ariyalur Group in Tamil Nadu, southern India whose strata date back to the Maastrichtian stage of the Late Cretaceous. Dinosaur eggs of Megaloolithus cylindricus are among the fossils that have been recovered from the sandy limestones of the formation.

Fossil content 
The following fossils were reported from the formation:
 Gyrodina
 Gyrodina globosa
 Neobulimina sp.
 Textulariina
 Textularia nacataensis
 Rhynchonellata
 Rectithyris subdepressa
 Rhynchonella sp.
 Bivalves
 Inoceramus bulbus
 I. tamulicus
 Pycnodonta vesicularis
 Ostrea (Alectryonia)
 Gastropods
 Anisomyon indicus
 Echinoids
 Hemipneustes compressus
 Fossil eggs
 Megaloolithus cylindricus

See also 
 List of dinosaur-bearing rock formations
 List of stratigraphic units with dinosaur trace fossils
 Dinosaur eggs

References

Bibliography 
  
 
 
 

Geologic formations of India
Upper Cretaceous Series of Asia
Maastrichtian Stage
Cretaceous India
Limestone formations
Shallow marine deposits
Reef deposits
Ooliferous formations
Paleontology in India
Formations